Tsvetan Radoslavov Hadzhidenkov (1863 – 1931) was a Bulgarian teacher and the author of the current national anthem of Bulgaria, Mila Rodino.

Born in Svishtov in 1863, he graduated in philosophy in Leipzig. In 1885, while en route to the battlefield during the Serbo-Bulgarian War, Radoslavov composed the song Gorda Stara Planina ("Proud Old Mountain"), which was polished by the composer Dobri Hristov in 1905 and became a national anthem of Bulgaria in 1963 as Mila Rodino.

Besides creating the Bulgarian national anthem, Radoslavov was also a prominent scientist. He was one of the three Bulgarians (with Dr Krastyo Krastev and Dimitar Aleksiev) that took their doctor's degree by the father of modern psychology, Wilhelm Wundt. Rejecting invitations to work as a teacher in Vienna, Leipzig and Prague, he returned to Bulgaria to work at the Third High School for Boys in Sofia, believing he was helping the development of modern Bulgaria by teaching students European and ancient languages, psychology, ethics and logic.

Footnotes

References

External link

1863 births
1931 deaths
Bulgarian classical composers
Male classical composers
Romantic composers
20th-century classical composers
National anthem writers
People from Svishtov
People of the Serbo-Bulgarian War
20th-century male musicians
19th-century male musicians